Hyperolius acutirostris is a species of frog in the family Hyperoliidae. It is endemic to southwestern Cameroon, found as far east as the region of Yaoundé. Common name sharpsnout reed frog has been coined for it.

Description
Males measure  and adult females  in snout–vent length. The dorsal pattern often involves alternating dark and light broad transverse bands. A light band in front of the urostyle is always present. The gular flap is very small. Undersides of the feet, hands, and (often) lower jaw have black pigmentation. There are small tubercles on the dorsum. The canthus rostralis is distinct. The pupils are horizontal.

The male advertisement call is a "clack".

Habitat and conservation
It is a strictly arboreal species, and also reproduction takes place in water in tree holes. It is common in suitable habitat but threatened by habitat loss caused by logging, agriculture, and human settlements.

References

acutirostris
Amphibians of Cameroon
Endemic fauna of Cameroon
Amphibians described in 1875
Taxa named by Reinhold Wilhelm Buchholz
Taxa named by Wilhelm Peters
Taxonomy articles created by Polbot